, or simply known as BNA by Netflix internationally, is an original Japanese anime television series produced by Studio Trigger and directed by Yoh Yoshinari. The series' first six episodes premiered on Netflix in Japan in March 2020; another six episodes premiered in May of the same year. The series also aired on Fuji TV's +Ultra anime programming block from April to June 2020.

Plot
The series is set in a world where humans co-exist with a branch of humanity called Beastmen, who face persecution due to their ability to turn into humanoid animals through a trait in DNA called "Beast Factor". The series centers on Michiru Kagemori, a young teenage girl who suddenly turned into a tanuki beastman after her best friend Nazuna Hiwatashi was abducted following a blood transfusion. Michiru ran away to seek refuge in Anima City, a haven made for the Beastmen, and meets the mysterious wolf beastman Shirou Ogami who works for the city's mayor Barballet Rosé. The two work to investigate the circumstances of Michiru's transformation while keeping the peace in Anima City, only to stumble into a conspiracy involving Sylvasta Pharmaceuticals-a prestige medical research center in Anima City-whose unsavory employees were responsible for accidentally providing the blood used in Michiru’s transformation along with Nazuna’s, who the company placed in a cult to claim herself as the Beastmens’ guardian deity known as the Silver Wolf. But Michiru learns the real Silver Wolf is Shirou, who forced to reveal his true power when dealing with the Sylvasta researcher Yata, who mutated into a berserk monster following his arrest.

Michiru learns Shirou is an immortal who gained his powers as sole survivor of Nirvasyl, a city of Beastmen that was destroyed a millennia ago by humans, and dedicated himself to protecting his kind. Alan Sylvasta, the owner of Sylvasta Pharmaceuticals, reveals the Beastmen of Nirvasyl were actually victims of a stress-induced phenomenon called Nirvasyl Syndrome that caused them to kill each other before being finished off by the humans. Alan also explains that he is resolving the issue with Nazuna pretending to be the Silver Wolf to reduce stress while he developed a drug to render Beastmen human should they go berserk. But Alan’s actual plan is induce Nirvasyl Syndrome, having Nazuna exposed on stage while revealing himself to be a Beastman from a pure bloodline. The pair also learn that the cure to Nirvasyl Syndrome is Michiru and Nazuna’s blood, averting the crisis with Michiru accepting her condition while remaining in Anima City to help Shirou protect it.

Characters

A human high schooler who one day turned into a tanuki beastman and came to Anima City to find a way to turn herself back to normal, believing her transformation was initially a disease before learning it was the result of her being infused with beastman blood while in the hospital. Due to the circumstances of her transition into a beastman, Michiru can access the traits of other animals and stretch her form to massive lengths.

A wolf beastman with a very keen sense of smell who dedicates himself to protect Anima City, possessing immense strength and regenerative abilities along with immortality and ability to turn into a giant wolf. Shirou is later revealed to be once a normal beastman in the city of Nirvasyl a millennia prior, killed by Raymond Sylvasta along with the other Nirvasyl residents when they went berserk.

 Michiru's childhood friend and classmate with aspirations of becoming an idol prior to becoming kitsune beastman as the result of being infused in beastman blood while hospitalized, taken in by Sylvasta Pharmaceuticals to refine her abilities to alter her form. Alan convinces Nazuna to join the Silver Wolf cult alongside Boris Cliff under the alias of Déesse Louve to pose as the Silver Wolf, tricking the girl into believing that she is helping the beastmen.

 A rich, enigmatic entrepreneur and president of Sylvasta Pharmaceuticals who provides medical support to Anima City while expressing an interest in Michiru and Shirou for their unique physical capabilities. Revealing his ancestor Raymond Sylvasta was responsible for destroying Nirvasyl when its resident beastmen went berserk, Alan is aware of Shirou's identity as the Silver Wolf while explaining his intent to humanize all beastmen that succumb to Nirvasyl Syndrome. Alan later reveals himself to be a pureblood Beastman with a golden Cerberus version of Shirou's Silver Wolf form, revealing his prejudiced motives in eliminating Anima City's residents for being impure beastmen.

The mayor of Anima City who is a naked mole-rat beastman with a Ph.D. in Beastman genetics and is a long-time acquaintance of Shirou, aware of his identity as the Silver Wolf when he rescued her from a research facility as a child. She is also aware of Michiru's condition, assumed to be a disease at the time, and pledges to help find her a cure while asking her to keep it a secret to prevent a mass panic.

A mink beastman who is involved in all sorts of shady dealings. She helps Michiru from time to time but also asks for a favor in exchange for her help.

A Great Dane beastman who is a police inspector and sometimes relies on Ogami for help.

A cockerel beastman and Melissa's husband, who give Michiru a place to stay. He and his wife are devoted believers and worshipers of the Silver Wolf.

A wombat beastman and Gem's wife. She and her husband are devoted believers and worshipers of the Silver Wolf.

A beluga whale beastman who is the head of a powerful gang and Nina's doting and overprotective father. He has an immense hatred for humans because his father (Nina's grandfather) was killed by beastman hunters then cooked and eaten shortly after -- although his daughter says it didn't actually happen, and is just the story she was told by him.

A human who is the presiding leader of Japan in the series. He worked with Mayor Rosé to establish Anima City, but he harbors an eternal distrust towards beastmen and isn't afraid to infringe on their rights.

A dolphin beastman who is the daughter of Giuliano Flip and has never been outside of Anima City. Nina is a friend of Michiru.

A young and naive bear beastman that Michiru often encounters.

A snake beastman and head priest of the Silver Wolf Order cult, who has taken a strong interest in Nazuna.

An albatross beastman mercenary who once fought as soldier against anti-beastmen radicals, only to become disillusioned over the governments infringing on the rights of migratory beastmen.

Release
During Anime Expo 2019, Trigger revealed that they are producing a new original anime television series that is directed by Yoh Yoshinari and written by Kazuki Nakashima.

The series premiered on Fuji TV's +Ultra anime programming block, BS Fuji, and other channels from April 8 to June 24, 2020. Prior to its Japanese television debut, the show's first six episodes were streamed on Netflix in Japan on March 21, 2020. The other six were later available on May 6, 2020. Distributed by Toho, the series was released in three volumes on DVD and Blu-ray in Japan. The first volume was released on August 19, 2020, while the other two gets a September 16 and October 14 release respectively. The theme song, "Ready To", is performed by Sumire Morohoshi as Michiru Kagemori, while electronic musician AAAMYYY does the ending theme, "Night Running".

BNA: Brand New Animal was released worldwide on June 30, 2020 on Netflix.

Episode list

Other media

Manga
A manga adaptation illustrated by Asano was serialized in Shueisha's Tonari no Young Jump web magazine from May 29, 2020, to September 9, 2022. Its sole volume was released on September 16, 2022.

Novel
A prequel novel BNA Zero: Massara ni Narenai Kemono-tachi (The Animals That Can't Be Brand New) written by Nekise Ise was released on April 23, 2020.

Soundtrack
The show's soundtrack was released on June 24, 2020.

Reception

Lisa De La Cruz of CBR praised the anime as "captivating," having an "original storyline, bright and flashy visuals, and anthropomorphic animals" and notes that since anime fans are often disappointed in second seasons, she asks if BNA should have a second season.

Awards
BNA: Brand New Animal was nominated for a Ursa Major Award in the Best Dramatic Series category. The Ursa Major awards are given in the field of furry fandom works and are the main awards in the field of anthropomorphism. BNA was also nominated for an Annie Award for Best Character Design in TV/Media.

References

External links
 at Netflix
Anime official website 

2020 anime television series debuts
Action anime and manga
Anime with original screenplays
Comedy anime and manga
Dash X Bunko
Fuji TV original programming
Netflix original anime
Racism in television
Science fantasy anime and manga
Seinen manga
Shueisha manga
Studio Trigger
Terrorism in television
Toho Animation